Bevis Shergold (née Reid, 13 June 1919 - 4 July 1997) was a British track and field athlete who competed in the 1938 European Athletics Championships and the 1948 Summer Olympics.

Reid was a member of the Mitcham Athletics Club in London. By the time she was 19 years old she had unofficially broken the British record in the discus and the javelin. She competed in both the shot put and the discus at the 1938 European Athletics Championships held in Vienna, finishing in fifth place in the shot put and eighth place in the discus.

Due to the war Reid had to wait ten years before she could compete in the Summer Olympics, where she threw 35.84 metres in the discus and finished in 14th place. She fared better in the shot put, finishing in third place in the qualifying round, but could only throw 12.170 metres in the final to finish in eighth place.

Nationally Reid won many medals, including the National Champion six times in the shot put (Two-hand aggregate, 8lb shot), five times discus champion, and once won the javelin.

During World War II she was an intelligence servicewoman and was one of the first women to be posted aboard. She worked in Egypt and Algeria as a translator during the interrogation of POWs.

References

1919 births
1997 deaths
British female shot putters
British female discus throwers
British female javelin throwers
Olympic athletes of Great Britain
Athletes (track and field) at the 1948 Summer Olympics